Abbeville is a city in northern France.

Abbeville may also refer to:

Places

France
 Abbeville-Saint-Lucien, Oise
 Abbéville-la-Rivière, Essonne
 Abbéville-lès-Conflans, Meurthe-et-Moselle

Ireland
 Abbeville, Dublin, a country house
 Abbeville, County Tipperary (townland), a townland
 Abbeville, Tipperary, a country house

United States
 Abbeville, Alabama, a city
 Abbeville, Georgia, a city
 Abbeville, Louisiana, a small city
 Abbeville, Mississippi, a town
 Abbeville (Lancaster, Pennsylvania), a historic home
 Abbeville, South Carolina, a city

United Kingdom
 Abbeville Village, a residential neighbourhood in London

See also
 Abbeville Publishing Group, a publisher
 Abbeville County, South Carolina
 Abbeville Historic District (disambiguation)
 Abbyville, Kansas
 Abbeyville (disambiguation)